Martin Kobylański (born 8 March 1994) is a professional footballer who plays as a attacking midfielder for 1860 Munich. Born in Germany, he has represented both his country of birth and Poland at youth level.

Early years 
Kobylański was born in Berlin as the son of former Polish international Andrzej Kobylański. At the time of his birth, his father was playing for 2. Bundesliga side Tennis Borussia Berlin. The majority of his youth however, he spent in nearby Cottbus where his father also had a three-year spell with local FC Energie.

Career

Professional debut in Cottbus 
At the age of only 17, he made his 2. Bundesliga debut on 6 November 2011 as a 15th-minute substitute for Dimitar Rangelov in a 2–0 home loss to SC Paderborn. At that time several Bundesliga clubs, including Bayern Munich, showed interest in his services.

Werder Bremen 
Kobylański signed for Werder Bremen II in summer 2012, and was a regular for the team throughout the following 2012–13 season. He made his debut for the first team in a friendly versus FC St. Pauli on 5 September 2013 and scored Werder's only goal in a shock 4–1 defeat. He had his debut in the Bundesliga for Werder Bremen on 21 September 2013 in a game against Hamburger SV in which he started.

Union Berlin (loan) 
In August 2014, Kobylański moved to his native city and signed for Union Berlin on a one-year loan. Werder Bremen also granted Union a purchase clause.

Preußen Münster 
Kobylanski spent the second half of the 2016–17 season at 3. Liga club Preußen Münster, on loan from Lechia Gdańsk, scoring five goals in 16 appearances while being deployed in different positions. He signed permanently for the club in June 2017, agreeing to a two-year contract.

Eintracht Braunschweig
On 30 May 2019, Eintracht Braunschweig confirmed, that they had signed Kobylanski for the 2019–20 season on a three-year contract. On 14 May 2022, it was announced he would leave the team at the end of the season.

1860 Munich
On 19 May 2022, Kobylański signed for 3. Liga side 1860 Munich.

References

External links 
 
 

1994 births
Living people
Footballers from Berlin
German people of Polish descent
German footballers
Polish footballers
Association football midfielders
Germany youth international footballers
Poland youth international footballers
Poland under-21 international footballers
Bundesliga players
2. Bundesliga players
3. Liga players
Ekstraklasa players
FC Energie Cottbus players
FC Energie Cottbus II players
SV Werder Bremen II players
SV Werder Bremen players
1. FC Union Berlin players
Lechia Gdańsk players
SC Preußen Münster players
Eintracht Braunschweig players
TSV 1860 Munich players
Polish expatriates in Germany
German expatriate footballers
Polish expatriate sportspeople in Germany
Expatriate footballers in Germany
German expatriate sportspeople in Poland
Expatriate footballers in Poland